Almirante Tamandaré do Sul is a municipality in the state of Rio Grande do Sul in the Southern Region of Brazil.

Its population is roughly 1,949 inhabitants (data from 2020).

The main economy production of Almirante Tamandaré do Sul is agriculture. Soybeans, corn and wheat are the major products.

See also
List of municipalities in Rio Grande do Sul

References

Municipalities in Rio Grande do Sul